Asher Lane is a five piece rock group from Germany. They have reached considerable success in the German charts, reaching 5 in the German airplay charts with "Explain".

Formation 
Asher Lane was founded by the five musicians who decided they wanted to "aim for moments with strong emotions for the audience and for us".

Outside Germany 
Previous to 2006 Asher Lane had limited success outside of Germany itself. A version of the #32 peaking "New Days" single was used in a marketing campaign by the Nivea dermological group, and has caused interest in the group from within the United Kingdom and America.

Discography
Beautiful Falling, released Mar 2, 2007 on label Exzess Berlin
Neon Love, released Oct 10, 2008 on label Exzess Berlin

References

External links 
[ AllMusic.com]
Billboard.com
Nivea Advert (feat .New Days)
official Web TV Show

German rock music groups